Events from the year 2014 in the British Virgin Islands.

Incumbents
Governor: 
 until August 1: William Boyd McCleary
 August 1-August 15: V. Inez Archibald (acting)
 starting August 15: John Duncan
Premier: Orlando Smith

Events

January
 13 January 2014 - First cases of the 2013–14 chikungunya outbreak are confirmed in the British Virgin Islands.
 17 January 2014 - Premier Orlando Smith promises Government will address the "harsh and brutal reality" of the Territory's $300 million unfunded public pension deficit.

March
 29 March 2014 - The People's Empowerment Party, led by Alvin Christopher, is launched.

April
 8 April 2014 - A major fire burns down a number of buildings in the capital, Road Town, during the early hours of the morning.

July
 25 July 2014 - The Auditor General issues a highly critical report relating to a $6 million public greenhouse project.  The greenhouses never produced any crops, and were eventually destroyed by Hurricane Irma.
 29 July 2014 - The House of Assembly amends the Computer Misuse and Cybercrimes Bill after the Governor, Boyd McCleary, refuses to sign it, citing concerns over press freedom.

August
 30 August 2014 - William "Kenny" Industrious dies at the age of 104.  He is believed to be the oldest ever Virgin Islander.

October
 7 October 2014 - Minister for Health, Ronnie Skelton, flies overseas for medical treatment leading to criticism.
 25 October 2014 - Former legislator Irene Penn-O'Neal is charged with gun possession alongside her children.  She is later acquitted.
 31 October 2014 - The law is amended so that legitimate and illegitimate children are to be treated equally.

November
 17 November 2014 - The 2010 BVI Census is finally published, nearly five years after it is conducted.  The Territory census is conducted every 10 years.

December
 31 December 2014 - BVI Airways suspends scheduled services "temporarily".

Deaths
 3 April - J.S. Archibald, QC - former Crown Counsel (predecessor office to Attorney General).

Footnotes

 
2010s in the British Virgin Islands
British Virgin Islands